Axel Gehrke (12 January 1942 – 22 September 2021) was a German politician for the populist Alternative for Germany (AfD) and a member of the Bundestag from 2017 until 2021.

Life and politics
Gehrke was born 1942 in Arnswalde (now Choszczno) and studied medicine. He became a Doctor of Medicine in 1971.

Gehrke entered the newly founded AfD in 2013 and became after the 2017 German federal election member of the Bundestag. He did not stand for reelection in the 2021 German federal election.

References

1942 births
2021 deaths
People from Choszczno County
People from the Province of Pomerania
Members of the Bundestag 2017–2021
Members of the Bundestag for the Alternative for Germany
Members of the Bundestag for Schleswig-Holstein